The SNCAO CAO.700 was a French prototype four-engined bomber of all-metal construction, developed shortly prior to and during the Second World War. Only a single example had been completed and flown when the surrender of France in June 1940 ended development of the aircraft.

Design and development

In 1937 the French Service Technique de l'Aeronautique (or Air Ministry) launched a specification to develop a four engined strategic bomber.

Operational history
The prototype flew for the first time on 24 June 1940, but further testing was cancelled due to the French surrender to Germany. Power was provided by four Gnome-Rhône 14N radial engines.

Specifications

See also
Related development
 SNCAO CAO.600

Aircraft of comparable role, configuration and era
 Boeing B-17
 Focke-Wulf Fw 200
 Handley Page Halifax
 Short Stirling

References

Further reading

External links
Aviafrance CAO-700

1940s French bomber aircraft
SNCAO 700
Four-engined tractor aircraft
Aircraft first flown in 1940
Four-engined piston aircraft